The Essexville-Hampton Public Schools is a public school district in Bay County in the U.S. state of Michigan, based in Essexville, Michigan.

Schools
The Essexville-Hampton Public Schools has two elementary schools, one junior high school, and one high school.

Elementary schools:
 W.R. Bush Elementary School
 Verellen Elementary School

Junior high school:
 Cramer Junior High School

High school:
 Garber High School

The district previously operated Hughes Elementary School, which began operations in 1927, and received a renovation in 1949. By 2012 the board was to vote whether to close the school effective June of that year.

References

Education in Bay County, Michigan
School districts in Michigan